Mademoiselle de Blois may refer to one of the following:

Marie Anne de Bourbon (1666–1739) illegitimate daughter of Louis XIV of France and Louise de La Vallière
Françoise Marie de Bourbon (1677–1749) illegitimate daughter of Louis XIV of France and Madame de Montespan